The Party of Civic Rights (SPO), also referred to as Zemanovci, is a centre-left, left-wing populist social-democratic political party in the Czech Republic founded in October 2009 by Miloš Zeman, the former prime minister of the Czech Republic and former leader of the Czech Social Democratic Party. Zeman was elected the president of the Czech Republic in the second round of the 2013 Czech presidential election. The party advocates direct democracy and the Nordic model.

In 2014, Jan Veleba, elected as an independent candidate in the 2012 Czech Senate election, joined the party and became its chairman. In the 2014 Czech Senate election, former JZD Slusovice chairman František Čuba was elected as the party's second senator. It has never won a seat in the Chamber of Deputies of the Czech Republic. In the 2016 Czech regional elections, it participated in a coalition with Okamura's Freedom and Direct Democracy party and won 16 seats.

Chairmen

Election results

Chamber of Deputies

Senate

Presidential

References 

 
2009 establishments in the Czech Republic
Left-wing parties in the Czech Republic
Political parties established in 2009
Social democratic parties in the Czech Republic
Miloš Zeman